The 1899 Toronto Argonauts season was the club's second season as a member club of the Ontario Rugby Football Union. The team finished in third place in the Senior Championship of the ORFU with two wins and four losses, and failed to qualify for the Dominion playoffs. However the Argos' 9-0 victory over the University of Toronto on October 21 won them the City Championship, for which they received the Wilson Trophy, the first trophy to be won by the Argos in their history.

The Argos played two non-league games during the 1899 season, defeating the University of Toronto 9-0 at Varsity Athletic Field on October 21 to claim the city championship, and losing 23-19 at Rosedale Field on November 4 to an Ireland touring side, a match played half under Canadian rules and half under rugby rules.

Regular season

Standings

Schedule

References

Toronto Argonauts seasons